Yelena Eckemoff is a Russian-born pianist, composer, poet, and visual artist. Her compositions blend classical music with jazz, and feature exploration and improvisation.

Music career
Eckemoff was born in Moscow, Russia, in the Soviet Union. Her mother was a professional pianist and teacher. When Eckemoff was four, she started to play piano by ear and took lessons from her mother. At seven, she attended Gnessin State Musical College, a school for gifted children. She studied classical piano at Moscow State Conservatory. After graduating, she taught piano in Moscow. She gave solo concerts, took jazz classes, composed music for several instruments, and played in a jazz-rock band.

In 1991, she moved to the U.S. She has recorded in several genres: classical, vocal, folk, Christian, and jazz. Although jazz is typically associated with improvisation, Eckemoff often writes scores for her songs. Her music has been described as classical chamber music in the context of improvisational jazz.

Discography
 Cold Sun (L&H, 2010)
 Grass Catching the Wind (L&H, 2010)
 Flying Steps (L&H, 2010)
 Forget-Me-Not (L&H, 2011)
 Glass Song  (L&H, 2013)
 A Touch of Radiance (L&H, 2014)
 Lions (L&H, 2014)
 Everblue  (L&H, 2015)
 Leaving Everything Behind (L&H, 2016)
 Blooming Tall Phlox (L&H, 2017)
 In the Shadow of a Cloud (L&H, 2017)
 Desert (L&H, 2018)
 Better Than Gold and Silver (L&H, 2018)
 Colors (L&H, 2019)
 Nocturnal Animals (L&H, 2020)
 Adventures of the Wildflower (L&H, 2021)
 I Am a Stranger in This World (L&H, 2022)
 Lonely Man and His Fish (L&H, 2023)

References

External links
 Official website

Living people
Soviet classical pianists
Russian classical pianists
Russian women pianists
20th-century classical pianists
American classical pianists
American women classical pianists
American jazz pianists
Year of birth missing (living people)
Place of birth missing (living people)
20th-century American pianists
20th-century American women pianists
21st-century classical pianists
21st-century American women pianists
21st-century American pianists